Oleksandr Pavlovych Myzyuk (born 31 May 1995) is a Ukrainian professional footballer who plays as a centre-back for Metalist Kharkiv.

References

External links
 Profile on Metalist Kharkiv official website
 
 

1995 births
Living people
Sportspeople from Kharkiv Oblast
Ukrainian footballers
Association football defenders
Ukrainian Premier League players
Ukrainian First League players
Ukrainian Second League players
FC Vovchansk players
FC Metalist Kharkiv players